Julian Knowle and Adil Shamasdin were the defending champions but chose not to defend their title.

Scott Clayton and Jonny O'Mara won the title after defeating Laurynas Grigelis and Alessandro Motti 5–7, 6–3, [15–13] in the final.

Seeds

Draw

References
 Main Draw

Trofeo Faip-Perrel - Doubles
2018 Doubles